Peke may refer to:

Peke, or Pekingese, a breed of dog originating in China
Elizabeth Peke Davis (1803-1860), a Hawaiian high chiefess and daughter of Isaac Davis Aikake
Hurricane Peke, a September 1987 hurricane 
Fifi the Peke, a fictional character created by The Walt Disney Company
Ainize Barea (born 1992), Spanish footballer known as Peke
Peke (To Love Ru), a fictional character in the manga series To Love Ru